Devikoppa is a village, It is located in the Kalghatgi taluk of Dharwad district of Karnataka, India.

Demographics
As of the 2011 Census of India there were 975 households in Devikoppa and a total population of 4,741 consisting of 2,392 males and 2,349 females. There were 745 children ages 0–6.

References

Villages in Dharwad district